is a 1968 Japanese comedy film directed by Kōji Chino. Its English title is The Wedding Salesman. The director of photography was Junnosuke Oguri. The film was scored by Naozumi Yamamoto.

Cast
Bonta Tokyo
Chieko Matsubara
Sanae Kitabayashi
Ichirō Zaitsu
Shirō Ōsaka
Takeshi Katō
Daizaburo Kirata
Hitoshi Ishii
Zenpei Saga
Masao Murata
Toru Yuri
Bontaro Taira

External links 
 

1968 films
Nikkatsu films
1960s Japanese films